Huttonsville State Farm Wildlife Management Area is located on  southeast of Huttonsville in Randolph County, West Virginia.  The wildlife management area is centered on the Huttonsville Correctional Center, a West Virginia state prison.

References

External links
West Virginia DNR District 3 Wildlife Management Areas

Wildlife management areas of West Virginia
Protected areas of Randolph County, West Virginia
IUCN Category V